Muhammad Nazhan bin Zulkifle (born 17 January 2001) is a Bruneian footballer who plays as a defender for Kasuka FC of the Brunei Super League and the Brunei national football team.

Club career
Since 2016, Nazhan has been a regular of his age group in Tabuan Muda, the national youth scheme formed by the National Football Association of Brunei Darussalam in preparation for international tournaments. He played league football for the 'B' team of Tabuan Muda in the 2017 Brunei Premier League.

Nazhan signed for Kasuka FC in the 2018–19 Brunei Super League as one of several established Brunei youth internationals snapped up by the ambitious club. He scored his first league goal on his debut in a 11–0 victory against Setia Perdana on 28 October 2018. He also captained Kasuka's Under-19 team that played in the national youth league. The team reached second place that season and was awarded an AFC Cup berth for the 2021 edition after securing an AFC club license, but their qualifying matches were ultimately cancelled due to the COVID-19 pandemic.

On 4 December 2022, Nazhan reached the final of the 2022 Brunei FA Cup with Kasuka, where they lost to DPMM FC by 2–1 in regular time.

International career

Nazhan's first international tournament in Brunei colours was the 2016 AFF U-16 Youth Championship held in Cambodia in July, where he played in all four fixtures, three from the start. Brunei lost all of their matches without scoring a goal, although they managed to keep the scoreline respectable with no more than four goals conceded per match. Then in late 2017, Nazhan was selected for both the 2017 AFF U-18 Youth Championship hosted by Myanmar in September and the 2018 AFC U-19 Championship qualification matches held in South Korea the following November. In the first match for the AFF tournament, Nazhan was a late defensive substitute for a 2–3 victory against the Philippines. He was brought on in different circumstances in the second game, which was a 1–8 defeat against Vietnam. He was given a start in the third game against Myanmar but was taken off early in the second half, and that ended his involvement for the rest of the tournament after said 7–0 loss. Two months later in Paju, South Korea, Nazhan played in all four matches of the group stage of the AFC qualifying tournament, two from the start including a 0–11 defeat to the host country. He was a second-half substitute in the final game which was a 2–2 draw against Timor-Leste.

Nazhan was a squad member for the April 2018 Hassanal Bolkiah Trophy with the under-21s but did not take the field. He was back with the under-19s for the 2018 AFF U-19 Youth Championship a few months later in Indonesia, playing in all of the matches as Brunei ended the tournament without a single point.

Nazhan was named as a member of the Brunei Under-23s playing in the 2022 AFF U-23 Championship held in Cambodia in February. He started the first game which was a 6–0 defeat at the hands of the host team, it was to be the extent of his involvement for the rest of the tournament.

After having been invited to training camps in 2020, Nazhan received a callup for the full national team in March 2022 for the international friendly against Laos away in Vientiane. He was a substitute in the fixture, replacing Abdul Azizi Ali Rahman for his international debut. The match ended 3–2 to the home team. Six months later, he faced the same opposition at home in a tri-nations tournament on 27 September. This time around, the Wasps produced a 1–0 victory.

Personal life 
Nazhan is attending the Laksamana College of Business in Bandar Seri Begawan, and won a national inter-college tournament in 2021 as their representative.

References

External links

2001 births
Living people
Bruneian footballers
Brunei international footballers